This is a list of fellows of the Royal Society elected in 1692.

Fellows 
Lord George Douglas (1657–1693)
Joannes Dolaeus  (1651–1707)
David Gregory  (1661–1708)
Sir Charles Issac  (1692–1711)
George Mackenzie 1st Earl of Cromarty (1630–1714)
Sir William Trumbull  (1639–1716)
Johann Theodor Heinson  (1666–1726)
Edward Lany  (1667–1728)
Edward Southwell  (1671–1730)
Ralph Lane  (d. 1732)
Jonas Blackwell  (d. 1754)

References

1692
1692 in science
1692 in England